Elsdon Castle is a castle in the village of Elsdon about  to the southwest of Rothbury, in Northumberland, England, and also known as Mote Hills. The site is a Scheduled Ancient Monument.

The castle is the best preserved medieval motte and bailey castle site in Northumberland. It was built by Robert de Umfraville in 1076, not long after the Norman Conquest and stands on a natural spur of a hill. The site is open to the public without charge.

Elsdon Castle is thought to have been abandoned after it was superseded by the nearby Harbottle Castle in 1160. It was abandoned by the mid-13th century, and is not mentioned in the estate of Gilbert de Umfraville when he died in 1245.

Legend has gathered around the castle. According to one tale a Danish giant lived on the hill and terrorised the neighbourhood. This may be a reference to Siward the Dane, earl of Northumberland in the reign of Edward the Confessor.

In the 18th century, excavation around the side revealed a Roman stone, which may have come from the fort at High Rochester and re-used for building. A pottery vessel is believed to have been discovered in the 19th century.

Elsdon Tower is nearby: a pele tower dating from the late 14th or early 15th century, which may also have been built by the de Umfravilles, though for six hundred years it was the Elsdon Rectory until 1961, when it was converted to private buildings.

References
Citations

Sources

External links

Images of Elsdon Castle
Elsdon Castle
GENUKI

Castles in Northumberland
Scheduled monuments in Northumberland